Hjulsbro IK is a Swedish football club located in Linköping.

Background 
Hjulsbro IK currently plays in Division 4 Östergötland Västra which is the sixth tier of Swedish football. They play their home matches at the UCS Arena in Linköping.

Hjulsbro IK are affiliated to Östergötlands Fotbollförbund.

Season to season

Footnotes

External links
 Hjulsbro IK – Official website
 Hjulsbro IK on Facebook

Sport in Östergötland County
Football clubs in Östergötland County
Association football clubs established in 1930
1930 establishments in Sweden